Emperor Muzong of Liao (19 September 931 – 12 March 969), personal name Yelü Jing, infant name Shulü, was the fourth emperor of the Khitan-led Liao dynasty of China. He was the eldest son of the second Liao emperor, Emperor Taizong. He succeeded his cousin, Emperor Shizong, after the latter was murdered in 951.

Rebellions
Emperor Muzong's reign was plagued by plots and rebellions against him from both the imperial clan and the Xiao consort clan. He fired many ministers who worked for Emperor Shizong, and used force against those who dared to rebel against him. However, his brutal use of force and repression was eventually able to restore stability and the authority of the throne.

Relations with other Chinese dynasties
The Later Zhou dynasty took advantage of Emperor Muzong's troubles to consolidate its position in northern China, a region that had been under the influence of the Khitans since earlier in the century. Despite this, the Northern Han dynasty, who remained under the protection of the Liao dynasty were able to maintain their independence.

The Later Zhou dynasty attacked Liao positions in 958 in an attempt to regain the Sixteen Prefectures. This provoked Emperor Muzong to lead a large army to the southern capital (present-day Beijing). Military confrontation was averted with the death of the Later Zhou emperor Chai Rong. Early the next year, Emperor Muzong returned to the capital.

Midway through Emperor Muzong's reign, the Northern Song dynasty had supplanted the last of the Five Dynasties, the Later Zhou dynasty. Relations between the Liao dynasty and Northern Song dynasty were peaceful during the reign of Emperor Muzong. Despite this peace, there were two issues outstanding between the two states that would result in war after Emperor Muzong's reign: those of the Sixteen Prefectures and the Northern Han dynasty. Neither of these issues would be resolved during the reign of Emperor Muzong. The two states began exchanging annual visits during the Chinese New Year. Profitable trade also continued to grow between the two sides.

Ancestry

In popular culture
Portrayed by Li Ning in the 2020 Chinese TV series The Legend of Xiao Chuo.

References

931 births
969 deaths
Liao dynasty emperors
10th-century Chinese monarchs
10th-century rulers in Asia
Murdered Chinese emperors
10th-century Khitan rulers